A saturated fat is a type of fat in which the fatty acid chains have all single bonds.  A fat known as a glyceride is made of two kinds of smaller molecules: a short glycerol backbone and fatty acids that each contain a long linear or branched chain of carbon (C) atoms. Along the chain, some carbon atoms are linked by single bonds (-C-C-) and others are linked by double bonds (-C=C-). A double bond along the carbon chain can react with a pair of hydrogen atoms to change into a single -C-C- bond, with each H atom now bonded to one of the two C atoms. Glyceride fats without any carbon chain double bonds are called saturated because they are "saturated with" hydrogen atoms, having no double bonds available to react with more hydrogen.

Most animal fats are saturated. The fats of plants and fish are generally unsaturated. Various foods contain different proportions of saturated and unsaturated fat. Many processed foods like foods deep-fried in hydrogenated oil and sausage are high in saturated fat content. Some store-bought baked goods are as well, especially those containing partially hydrogenated oils. Other examples of foods containing a high proportion of saturated fat and dietary cholesterol include animal fat products such as lard or schmaltz, fatty meats and dairy products made with whole or reduced fat milk like yogurt, ice cream, cheese and butter. Certain vegetable products have high saturated fat content, such as coconut oil and palm kernel oil. 

Guidelines released by many medical organizations, including the World Health Organization, have advocated for reduction in the intake of saturated fat to promote health and reduce the risk from cardiovascular diseases.

Fat profiles
While nutrition labels regularly combine them, the saturated fatty acids appear in different proportions among food groups.  Lauric and myristic acids are most commonly found in "tropical" oils (e.g., palm kernel, coconut) and dairy products.  The saturated fat in meat, eggs, cacao, and nuts is primarily the triglycerides of palmitic and stearic acids.

Examples of saturated fatty acids

Some common examples of saturated fatty acids:
Lauric acid with 12 carbon atoms (contained in coconut oil, palm kernel oil, cow's milk, and breast milk)
Myristic acid with 14 carbon atoms (contained in cow's milk and dairy products)
Palmitic acid with 16 carbon atoms (contained in palm oil and meat)
Stearic acid with 18 carbon atoms (also contained in meat and cocoa butter)

Association with diseases

Cardiovascular disease
The effect of saturated fat on heart disease has been extensively studied. Many health authorities, such as the Academy of Nutrition and Dietetics, the British Dietetic Association, American Heart Association, the World Heart Federation, the British National Health Service, among others, advise that saturated fat is a risk factor for cardiovascular diseases. In 2020, the World Health Organization recommended lowering dietary intake of saturated fats to less than 10% of total energy consumption, and increasing intake of unsaturated fats. There is moderate-quality evidence that reducing the proportion of saturated fat in the diet and replacing it with unsaturated fats or carbohydrates for a period of at least two years leads to a reduction in the risk of cardiovascular disease. In 2019, the UK Scientific Advisory Committee on Nutrition concluded that higher saturated fat consumption is associated with raised blood cholesterol and increased risk of heart disease.

A 2021 review found that diets high in saturated fat were associated with higher mortality from all causes, as well as from cardiovascular disease.

A 2023 review by the World Health Organization found convincing evidence that higher saturated fat consumption is associated with higher coronary heart
disease incidence and mortality.

Dyslipidemia

The consumption of saturated fat is generally considered a risk factor for dyslipidemia, which in turn is a risk factor for some types of cardiovascular disease.

Meta-analyses have found a significant relationship between saturated fat and serum cholesterol levels. High total cholesterol levels, which may be caused by many factors, are associated with an increased risk of cardiovascular disease. 

There are other pathways involving obesity, triglyceride levels, insulin sensitivity, endothelial function, and thrombogenicity, among others, that play a role in cardiovascular disease. Different saturated fatty acids have differing effects on various lipid levels. There is strong evidence that lauric, myristic, and palmitic acids raise LDL-C, while stearic acid is more neutral.

Type 2 diabetes
A 2022 review of cohort studies found that the risk of type 2 diabetes was not associated with dietary intake of total saturated fats, palmitic acid, and stearic acid. Dietary lauric acid and myristic acid, present in plant oils and also in dairy fat, were associated with reduced risk of diabetes.

Cancer

Several reviews of case–control studies have found that saturated fat intake is associated with breast cancer risk and mortality.

Observational studies have shown that a diet high in saturated fat increases the risk of prostate cancer.

Dietary sources

Dietary recommendations
Recommendations to reduce, limit or replace dietary intake of trans fats and saturated fats, in favor of unsaturated fats, are made by the World Health Organization, American Heart Association, Health Canada, the US Department of Health and Human Services, the UK National Health Service, the UK Scientific Advisory Committee on Nutrition, the Australian Department of Health and Aging, the Singapore Ministry of Health, the Indian Ministry of Health and Family Welfare, the New Zealand Ministry of Health, and Hong Kong's Department of Health.

In 2003, the World Health Organization (WHO) and Food and Agriculture Organization (FAO) expert consultation report concluded:

A 2004 statement released by the Centers for Disease Control (CDC) determined that "Americans need to continue working to reduce saturated fat intake…" In addition, reviews by the American Heart Association led the Association to recommend reducing saturated fat intake to less than 7% of total calories according to its 2006 recommendations. This concurs with similar conclusions made by the US Department of Health and Human Services, which determined that reduction in saturated fat consumption would positively affect health and reduce the prevalence of heart disease.

The United Kingdom, National Health Service claims the majority of British people eat too much saturated fat. The British Heart Foundation also advises people to cut down on saturated fat, and to read labels on the food they buy. The British Nutrition Foundation have said that based on the totality of available evidence the saturated fatty acids should make up no more than 10% of total dietary energy.

A 2004 review stated that "no lower safe limit of specific saturated fatty acid intakes has been identified" and recommended that the influence of varying saturated fatty acid intakes against a background of different individual lifestyles and genetic backgrounds should be the focus in future studies.

Blanket recommendations to lower saturated fat were criticized at a 2010 conference debate of the American Dietetic Association for focusing too narrowly on reducing saturated fats rather than emphasizing increased consumption of healthy fats and unrefined carbohydrates.  Concern was expressed over the health risks of replacing saturated fats in the diet with refined carbohydrates, which carry a high risk of obesity and heart disease, particularly at the expense of polyunsaturated fats which may have health benefits.  None of the panelists recommended heavy consumption of saturated fats, emphasizing instead the importance of overall dietary quality to cardiovascular health.

In a 2017 comprehensive review of the literature and clinical trials, the American Heart Association published a recommendation that saturated fat intake be reduced or replaced by products containing monounsaturated and polyunsaturated fats, a dietary adjustment that could reduce the risk of cardiovascular diseases by 30%.

Molecular description

  The two-dimensional illustration has implicit hydrogen atoms bonded to each of the carbon atoms in the polycarbon tail of the myristic acid molecule (there are 13 carbon atoms in the tail; 14 carbon atoms in the entire molecule).

Carbon atoms are also implicitly drawn, as they are portrayed as intersections between two straight lines.  "Saturated," in general, refers to a maximum number of hydrogen atoms bonded to each carbon of the polycarbon tail as allowed by the Octet Rule.  This also means that only single bonds (sigma bonds) will be present between adjacent carbon atoms of the tail.

Notes

See also

List of saturated fatty acids
List of vegetable oils
Food guide pyramid
Healthy diet
Diet and heart disease
Fast food
Junk food
Advanced glycation endproduct
ANGPTL4
Iodine value
Framingham Heart Study
Seven Countries Study
Ancel Keys
D. Mark Hegsted
Western pattern diet

References

Lipids
Nutrition